Panel beater or panelbeater is a term used in some Commonwealth countries to describe a person who repairs vehicle bodies back to their factory state after having been damaged (e.g., after being involved in a collision). In the United States and Canada, the same job is done by an auto body mechanic.

Description
Panel beaters repair body work using skills such as planishing and metalworking techniques, welding, use of putty fillers, and other skills. Accident repair may require the panel beater to repair or replace parts of a vehicle. These parts may be made from various metals including steels and alloys, many different plastics, fibreglass and others.

The common panel beater will work on everyday vehicles, cars, vans or 4WDs. Specialised areas include repairs to motorcycles, trucks and even aircraft. Some panel beaters also work exclusively on vehicle restorations, and do not repair smash work at all. Others may specialise in body customisation such as is seen on hot rods.

Special equipment examples:

Various hammers and dollies used for planishing
Body files and flippers
Assembly tools such as socket sets, screwdrivers and spanners
Other hand tools like pliers, tin snips, vise grips, punches, chisels, etc.
Hydraulic pushing/pulling devices
Vehicle measuring and aligning devices, or jigs e.g.
Vehicle lift hoists
Personal safety equipment such as boots, overalls, safety glasses, welding helmets, gloves, respirators and hearing protection
Welding equipment – MIG or TIG
Stud welder for pulling out dents

Special equipment for restoration, advanced panel repair or panel fabrication from scratch include:
English wheel
Power hammer
Pear shaped mallets and sandbags
Benders/folders
Rollers/rolls
Beaders/swaging machines
Station bucks
Templates
Oxy-acetylene welding equipment
Lead loading equipment

Training and certification
Training to become a panel beater is done by completing a trade apprenticeship. For the most part these apprenticeships are around three years long, but can be completed earlier. These usually consist of three years on the job training mixed with schooling at a trade school or TAFE. The fourth year is usually on the job training alone.

Trade schools, although helpful are not required and neither is a formal apprenticeship. 

Once you become an auto body technician there are many different certifications that you can obtain for specific repair techniques, most of which are available through I-CAR training.

References

Installation, maintenance, and repair occupations
Industrial occupations